The men's long jump event  at the 1980 European Athletics Indoor Championships was held on 2 March in Sindelfingen. The original winner, Ronald Desruelles of Belgium, was later disqualified after testing positive for a banned substance.

Results

References

Long jump at the European Athletics Indoor Championships
Long